Neopasiphae is a genus of bees belonging to the family Colletidae.

The species of this genus are found in Australia.

Species:

Neopasiphae insignis 
Neopasiphae mirabilis 
Neopasiphae simplicior

References

Colletidae